Helmut Pau Kangulohi Angula (born 11 November 1945) is a Namibian businessman, politician, former cabinet minister and writer. He is currently the director of various private companies, after leaving government in 2010, and a longtime member of the central committee and the politburo of the ruling SWAPO party.

Biography

Angula was born in Ontananga, Oshikoto Region, and joined SWAPO in 1963, just three years after the movement's founding. Angula holds a M.Sc Degree from Voronezh State University in the USSR. During his time with SWAPO, Angula served as the deputy principal of the Health and Education Center in Nyango, Zambia from 1975–1976 and then rose to director of the center until 1977. From 1977- 1986 he was SWAPO chief representative to Cuba, the Caribbean and Latin America, and from 1986 to 1989 served as the SWAPO permanent observer at the United Nations in New York, and as the chief representative to North America.

He was elected to the National Assembly of Namibia in 1990 and was deputy minister of Mines and Energy from 1990 to 1991, Minister of Fisheries and Marine Resources from 1991 to 1995, Minister of Finance from 1995 to 1996, and Minister of Agriculture, Water and Rural Development from 1996-2004. In 2005 Angula was appointed director-general of the National Planning Commission, where he was responsible for negotiating the Namibia- US Millennium Challenge Account Agreement worth $380 million US and supported programs implemented by US/Namibian Governments in the education, environment and agricultural sectors. He was also responsible for negotiating with the World Bank and Education and Training Sector Improvement Programs "ETSIP" Agreement.

A vacancy that occurred on the SWAPO list in November 2007 opened up a SWAPO seat in the National Assembly, and Angula was subsequently sworn in as a Member of Parliament again at the beginning of a parliamentary session on 22 November 2007. In April 2008, he was appointed as Minister of Works and Transport, he held this position until March 2010. Since leaving government, Angula has embarked on various business activities.

Angula is currently a member of the central committee and the politburo of SWAPO, and its secretary for the department of transportation.

Angula was not re-elected to the National Assembly in the November 2009 parliamentary election, and instead pursued a career in business. On Heroes' Day 2014 he was conferred the Most Brilliant Order of the Sun, Second Class.

Writing

In 1988, he published "The Two Thousand days of Haimbodi Ya Haufiku", an "autobiographical novel from Namibia". The novel was first published in German translation by Karl H. Heidtmann, based on the original English-language manuscript and reworked in collaboration with the author, an edition in the original English followed in 1990.

Bibliography
 .
 .

References

1945 births
Living people
People from Oshikoto Region
Ovambo people
SWAPO politicians
Works and transport ministers of Namibia
Directors-general of the National Planning Commission of Namibia
Agriculture ministers of Namibia
Finance ministers of Namibia
Fisheries ministers of Namibia
Members of the National Assembly (Namibia)
Voronezh State University alumni